1997 Vissel Kobe season

Competitions

Domestic results

J.League

Emperor's Cup

J.League Cup

Player statistics

 † player(s) joined the team after the opening of this season.

Transfers

In:

Out:

Transfers during the season

In
Noriyoshi Fujiwara
Matthew Bingley (from Marconi Fairfield on July)
Budimir Vujačić (from Sporting Lisbon on August)

Out
Laudrup (on July)
Ziad (on August)
Bickel (on September)
Masaki Tsukano (to Tokyo Gas)

Awards
none

References
J.LEAGUE OFFICIAL GUIDE 1997, 1997 
J.LEAGUE OFFICIAL GUIDE 1998, 1996 
J.LEAGUE YEARBOOK 1999, 1999 
 試合日程 / 結果一覧 ヴィッセル神戸 | VISSEL KOBE

Other pages
 J. League official site
 Vissel Kobe official site

Vissel Kobe
Vissel Kobe seasons